Emmanuel Beau de Loménie (1896-1974) was a French journalist and political writer.

Early life
Emmanuel Beau de Loménie was born on February 4, 1896, in Paris, France. His paternal grandfather, Louis de Loménie, was an essayist.

Career
Beau de Loménie was a journalist and a teacher. He was a contributor to conservative journals like Écrits de Paris, La France catholique or Carrefour.

Beau de Loménie was the author of many political books. He wrote about François-René de Chateaubriand, Édouard Drumont and Charles Maurras. With Les responsabilités des dynasties bourgeoises, he wrote a five-volume study of bourgeois families who supposedly controlled the fate of France, from the French Revolution to World War II. In L'Algérie trahie par l'argent, he wrote a defense of French Algeria, arguing that French civilization was superior. He was also "openly antisemitic".

Death
Beau de Loménie died on February 8, 1974, in Paris, France.

Works

References

1896 births
1974 deaths
French political writers
20th-century French journalists